In The Labyrinth is a 1980 role-playing game supplement for The Fantasy Trip published by Metagaming. An expanded version released in 2019 by Steve Jackson Games as part of the company's revival of The Fantasy Trip.

Contents
The Metagaming release of In the Labyrinth is the rest of The Fantasy Trip system's rules, including character creation, labyrinth generation, how to run an adventure, creature descriptions, and the weapons table. The Steve Jackson Games rerelease includes all the same character creating and game mastering rules in addition to the full combat and magic rules published by Metagaming as Advanced Melee and Advanced Wizard.

Publication history
In the Labyrinth was written by Steve Jackson and published by Metagaming in 1980 as an 80-page book.

Jackson planned for The Fantasy Trip to be released as a boxed set, but publisher Howard M. Thompson decided that the price was too high and so he split the product into four books: Advanced Melee (1980), which had the combat extensions to the Melee system, Advanced Wizard (1980), which had the magic extensions, In the Labyrinth (1980), which had the Games Master rules, and Tollenkar's Lair (1980), which was a GM adventure.

In 2017, Jackson reacquired the rights to The Fantasy Trip and the following year his company re-released In the Labyrinth. The new, 178-page version adheres more closely to Jackson's original vision for TFT, combining in a single tome the combat, magic, and game mastering rules that Metagaming had published across three books.

Reception
Steve Perrin reviewed In the Labyrinth for Different Worlds magazine and stated that "this is a very readable and enjoyable work. As a guide for GMs who devise the fantasy worlds for others to adventure in, this is an excellent reference, whether the users ever play Melee or Wizard or neither one."

Eric Goldberg reviewed In The Labyrinth in Ares Magazine #3 and commented that "ITL is as good as any FRP system currently available commercially. It has the Metagaming hallmark of easy accessibility, but also has the limitations usually found in the company's game (which, to be fair, are caused in part by the system's size constraints)."

Reviews
The Space Gamer #31 (Sept., 1980)
Pegasus #10 (Oct. 1982)

References

Fantasy role-playing game supplements
Role-playing game supplements introduced in 1980